Fauces is an architectural term given by Vitruvius (Arch. 3.6.3) to narrow passages on either side of the tablinum, through which access could be obtained from the atrium to the peristylar court in the rear. 
The Latin word  means "the upper part of the throat", and figuratively refers to any kind of narrow entrance or passageway.

Bibliography
 Greenough, J. B. 1890. "The Fauces of the Roman House." Harvard Studies in Classical Philology 1:1-12. (at JSTOR).

References

Ancient Roman architectural elements